Friedrichsburg (German for "Frederick's castle") may refer to:
Fort Friedrichsburg in Königsberg, Prussia
Groß Friedrichsburg, colonial fort in Ghana
Friedrichsburg, a castle which preceded Mannheim Palace
a part of Hessisch Oldendorf, Hesse
a former palace in Lampertheim, Hesse

See also
Fredericksburg (disambiguation)
Frederiksborg (disambiguation)